National Basketball Arena, also known as Tallaght Arena, is an indoor sporting arena located in Tymon Park, Tallaght, South Dublin, adjacent to the M50 motorway. The capacity of the arena is 2,500 people and it opened in January 1993. It is used mainly for basketball events, but has also hosted other indoor sports, most notably futsal, as well as exhibitions, concerts and cultural events.

Basketball
The National Basketball Arena serves as the headquarters of Basketball Ireland. It also serves as the home court of the Ireland national basketball team, the Ireland women's national basketball team and Hibernia Basketball. It has previously served as the home court of Shamrock Rovers Hoops. It also regularly hosts Super League games.   The arena hosted the 1994 European Promotion Cup for Men. In November 2022 it hosted the Dublin Basketball Challenge with teams from the MAAC and ASUN competing.

Futsal

The National Basketball Arena has hosted finals of both the FAI Futsal Cup and the Emerald Futsal League. It has also served as the home court of both the Republic of Ireland national futsal team and Shamrock Rovers. The arena has also hosted international futsal tournaments. In February 2009 the Republic of Ireland played against Cyprus, England and Kazakhstan in a 2010 UEFA Futsal Championship preliminary group qualifying tournament. The Republic of Ireland acted as hosts and all six group games were played at the National Basketball Arena. The Republic lost to both Cyprus and Kazakhstan, either side of a 2–0 win against England. In January 2011 the Republic of Ireland played against Andorra, Norway and Israel in a UEFA Futsal Euro 2012 preliminary group qualifying tournament. Once again the Republic of Ireland acted as hosts and all six group games were again played at the National Basketball Arena.
In August 2014 when Eden Futsal Club hosted their 2014–15 UEFA Futsal Cup preliminary group, all six games were played at the National Basketball Arena.

Boxing

The arena has hosted many boxing fights, featuring, among others, Wayne McCullough, Eddie Hyland, Naseem Hamed, Oisin Fagan, Michael Carruth, Scott Dixon and Patrick Hyland.

Wrestling & Other sports

The arena hosted an American Wrestling Rampage show in 2008 which featured wrestlers such as Rob Van Dam, Sabu, Chris Masters, Rene Dupree and Scotty 2 Hotty. The arena has also hosted many Irish Whip Wrestling shows which have featured wrestlers such as Tatanka, Daivari, Balls Mahoney, Nigel McGuinness, Andy Boy Simmonz and Chad Collyer. From February 2019 the arena will host regular Wrestling events presented by Ireland’s premier wrestling company  Over the Top Wrestling (OTT). It has also hosted karate, gymnastics, taekwondo, and MMA events.

References

External links
   National Basketball Arena on Facebook

Sports venues in South Dublin (county)
Indoor arenas in the Republic of Ireland
Basketball in South Dublin (county)
Basketball venues in Ireland
Boxing venues in the Republic of Ireland
Futsal in the Republic of Ireland
1993 establishments in Ireland
Sports venues completed in 1993